The Strawberry River is an  river located in eastern Utah, United States.

Description
Strawberry River's headwaters is located in the Wasatch Mountains of the western Uintah Basin. The river flows south into Strawberry Reservoir, then through Soldier Creek Dam.

This part of the river can only be accessed by a trail that runs along the north bank. No motorized vehicles are allowed. 
 below Soldier Creek Dam, the river runs by the Strawberry Pinnacles (sedimentary formations), where it is joined by the tributaries Avintaquin Creek and Red Creek. The narrow canyon the river runs through is characterized by high cliffs and dense foliage.

The river is impounded in the Starvation Reservoir within Starvation State Park. After exiting the reservoir the stream joins the Duchesne River east of the town of Duchesne.

During extremely cold winters, areas of the river have frozen solid, causing the river to overflow its banks and flood the canyon floor. This happened in 1983 and 2000.

See also

 List of rivers of Utah

References

External links

Rivers of Utah
Rivers of Duchesne County, Utah
Rivers of Wasatch County, Utah
Tributaries of the Colorado River in Utah
Wasatch Range